The UCI Indoor Cycling World Championships are the set of world championship events for the disciplines of artistic cycling and a tournament of cycle ball. The World Championships are regulated by the Union Cycliste Internationale.

The UCI awards a gold medal and a rainbow jersey to the winner. Silver and bronze medals are awarded to the second and third place contestants. World champions wear their rainbow jersey until the following year's championship, but they may wear it only in the type of event in which they won it.

Single Artistic cycling – Men

Medalists by year

Top medal winners (1956–2014)

Medals by countries (1956–2014)

Single Artistic cycling – Women

Medalists by year

Top medal winners (1959–2014)

Medals by countries (1959–2014)

Pairs Artistic cycling – Women

Medalists by year

Pairs Artistic cycling – Mixed

Medalists by year

Quartets Artistic cycling – Women/Mixed

Medalists by year

Cycle-ball

References

External links

 
Indoor World Championships